Eupithecia russula is a moth in the family Geometridae. It is found in south-western China (Tibet).

The wingspan is about 21 mm.

References

Moths described in 2004
russula
Moths of Asia